Pipestone was a provincial electoral district  for the Legislative Assembly of the province of Saskatchewan, Canada. Located in southeastern Saskatchewan, this district was created as "Whitewood" before the 1st Saskatchewan general election in 1905. In 1908 the riding was redrawn and renamed "Pipestone", after the Pipestone Creek that flowed through the district.

This constituency was abolished before the 8th Saskatchewan general election in 1934 into Cannington, Moosomin and Qu'Appelle-Wolseley. It is now part of the Moosomin constituency.

Members of the Legislative Assembly

Election results

|-
 
| style="width: 130px" |Provincial Rights
|Archibald Gillis
|align="right"|867
|align="right"|65.24%
|align="right"|–

|- bgcolor="white"
!align="left" colspan=3|Total
!align="right"|1,329
!align="right"|100.00%
!align="right"|

|-
 
| style="width: 130px" |Provincial Rights
|Archibald Gillis
|align="right"|1,001
|align="right"|64.13%
|align="right"|-1.11

|- bgcolor="white"
!align="left" colspan=3|Total
!align="right"|1,561
!align="right"|100.00%
!align="right"|

|-

 
|Conservative
|Archibald Gillis
|align="right"|982
|align="right"|49.40%
|align="right"|-14.73
|- bgcolor="white"
!align="left" colspan=3|Total
!align="right"|1,988
!align="right"|100.00%
!align="right"|

|-

 
|Conservative
|Robert Lillie Kidd
|align="right"|1,477
|align="right"|46.80%
|align="right"|-2.60
|- bgcolor="white"
!align="left" colspan=3|Total
!align="right"|3,156
!align="right"|100.00%
!align="right"|

|-

|Independent
|Thomas Harkness
|align="right"|1,530
|align="right"|45.17%
|align="right"|–

|Independent
|Allan Brown Potter
|align="right"|233
|align="right"|6.88%
|align="right"|–
|- bgcolor="white"
!align="left" colspan=3|Total
!align="right"|3,387
!align="right"|100.00%
!align="right"|

|-

|- bgcolor="white"
!align="left" colspan=3|Total
!align="right"|3,171
!align="right"|100.00%
!align="right"|

|-

|- bgcolor="white"
!align="left" colspan=3|Total
!align="right"|Acclamation
!align="right"|

|-

 
|Conservative
|Frederick Gore Leggett
|align="right"|1,790
|align="right"|41.66%
|align="right"|-
|- bgcolor="white"
!align="left" colspan=3|Total
!align="right"|4,297
!align="right"|100.00%
!align="right"|

See also
Whitewood – Northwest Territories territorial electoral district (1870–1905).

Electoral district (Canada)
List of Saskatchewan provincial electoral districts
List of Saskatchewan general elections
List of political parties in Saskatchewan
Whitewood, Saskatchewan

References
 Saskatchewan Archives Board – Saskatchewan Election Results By Electoral Division

Former provincial electoral districts of Saskatchewan